John Tiffin Stewart (18 November 1827 – 19 April 1913) was a notable New Zealand civil engineer and surveyor and mapper. He was born in Rothesay, Bute, Scotland, in 1827 and was married to the social activist Frances Stewart.

Career in New Zealand
Much of Stewart's early surveying work was in Palmerston North. Stewart and his family later moved to Wanganui. The home they built in Campbell Street Wanganui was later the Karitane home, "Stewart House", and also a hostel for Whanganui City College.

He worked as engineer for the Whanganui River Trust helping clear channels on the river.

References

1827 births
1913 deaths
New Zealand civil engineers
New Zealand surveyors
People from Whanganui
Scottish emigrants to New Zealand
20th-century New Zealand engineers